Claire Olivia Edwardes  (born 9 September 1975) is an Australian classical percussionist, artistic director, composer and advocate for change in the classical music sector. Edwardes is the co-founder and artistic director of Ensemble Offspring, roles she shared with composer Damien Ricketson until his retirement from the group in 2015. In 2016, she won two APRA Art Music Awards, with one going to Ensemble Offspring for "sustained services to Australian music for 20 years", and Edwardes receiving an individual award "for performance, advocacy and artistic leadership”. She is the only Australian to have won the Luminary Art Music Award for an Individual 3 times. In 2019, Edwardes created and performed the music and dance theatre work RECITAL with dancer Richard Cilli and director Gideon Obarzanek for Dance Massive 2019. Edwardes composed the music and sound design for RECITAL in collaboration with Paul Mac. In 2011 and 2017, Edwardes was a member of the Australian World Orchestra. In 2015-216, Edwardes was the Vice President of the New Music Network. Edwardes has appeared on television as an occasional host of Play School, and as a panelist on Spicks and Specks.  In 2021, Edwardes created The Australian Marimba Composition Kit and a comprehensive list of percussion works by female composers. Additionally, Edwardes has composed numerous works for solo waterphone. She is currently on staff as a percussion teacher at the Sydney Conservatorium of Music.

Early life, education and career 
Edwardes was born in Sydney's Inner West, where she now lives. She began learning piano at age 5 while living in country Victoria for several years and on returning to Sydney studied with Faye Lake throughout her life into her early 20's. Edwardes was educated at Fort Street High School and graduated as Student of the Year with a Bachelor of Music from Sydney Conservatorium of Music in 1997 where she studied with Daryl Pratt and Richard Miller. In 1999, Edwardes won the Symphony Australia Young Performers Award before relocating to the Netherlands to complete a master's degree at Codarts (with teachers Richard Janssen and Hans Leenders) and the Conservatorium van Amsterdam (with teachers Peter Prommel, Jan Pustjens and ) on a Dutch Government Nuffic Huygens Scholarship. Edwardes also founded her percussion groups Duo Vertigo with Niels Meliefste. During this time she also worked closely with composers including Louis Andriessen, Unsuk Chin, Harrison Birtwistle and Steve Reich.

Returning to Sydney in 2006, Claire became co-artistic director of Ensemble Offspring the group she had been part of the inaugural concert year of as part of the Sydney Spring Festival in 1995. Claire is endorsed by Adams Percussion and Vic Firth.

As a soloist and artistic director of Ensemble Offspring, Claire has extensively commissioned, programmed, curated, documented and performed music by living, Australian composers - in particular female identifying and First Nations composers.

Edwardes is the Australian Keychange Ambassador as well as the Donne Women in Music Ambassador.

Discography

Solo recordings 

 2021 Rhythms of Change Move
 2017 Clairaudient Move
 2016 Kammerbox ABC Classic
 2015 ONE Tall Poppies
 2013 Flash Tall Poppies
 2010 Coil Tall Poppies
 2002 Young Performer’s Solo Disc ABC Classic

Compilations and recordings with ensembles 

 2017 - 2021Offspring Bites 1, 2 & 3 (Ensemble Offspring)
 2019 & 2020 Women of Note ABC Classics ABC Classic
 2018 Music for the Dreaming (Ensemble Offspring) ABC Classic
 2015 Cycles & Circles (Ensemble Offspring) 
 2014 The Secret Noise (Ensemble Offspring) Curious Noise
 2007 Vertigo One (Duo Vertigo) Karnatic Lab Records
 2005 The Axe Manual (Nicolas Hodges) Metronome Label

Awards, nominations and fellowships

Awards and nominations 
2022 Medal of the Order of Australia (OAM)
2021 Finalist - Limelight Artist of the Year
2021 Nominated (Ensemble Offspring) Best Independent Classical Album or EP, AIR Awards
2020 Winner (Ensemble Offspring) - Sidney Myer Performing Arts Award
2019 Finalist - Creative Leadership Award, Australian Women in Music Awards
2019 Finalist - Excellence in Classical Music Award, Australian Women in Music Awards
2019 Nominated - Classical Act of the Year, National Live Music Awards
2005 3rd Prize (Duo Vertigo) - Gaudeamus International Interpreters Competition
2001 Winner - Concertgebouw Vriendenkrans Prize (Amsterdam)
2001 Winner - Llangollen International Instrumentalist (Wales)
2000 Winner - Tromp Percussion Competition (Utrecht)
1999 Winner - ABC Young Performers Award

APRA Art Music Awards 

2021 State Luminary Award (Ensemble Offspring)
2016 Award for Excellence by an Organisation (Ensemble Offspring)
2016 Award for Excellence by an Individual
2012 Award for Excellence by an Individual
2007 Award for Excellence by an Individual

Fellowships 

 2014 Australia Council Music Fellowship, Australia Council for the Arts
 2005 Freedman Fellowship, Music Council of Australia

References

External links

1975 births
Living people
Classical percussionists
Sydney Conservatorium of Music alumni
Conservatorium van Amsterdam alumni